Skien Station is a railway station located about one kilometer from downtown Skien in Vestfold og Telemark, Norway.

The station serves as terminus for the regional trains on the Vestfold Line (Vestfoldbanen) from Oslo via Vestfold and for the local trains to Notodden on the Bratsberg Line. The station was opened in 1917 as part of the Bratsberg Line. Skien Station was built following designs by Gudmund Hoel with Bjarne Friis Baastad and Ragnvald Utne. 

Following protest, the old Skien station (Skien gamle stasjon), which was located two kilometers further south, remained in operation from 1927 until 1963.

References

External links

Jernbaneverket's entry on Skien Station 

Railway stations in Vestfold og Telemark
Railway stations on the Bratsberg Line
Railway stations on the Vestfold Line
Railway stations opened in 1917
1917 establishments in Norway